Crimean Tatars in Turkey refers to citizens and denizens of Turkey who are, or descend from, the Tatars of Crimea.

Numbers

History
Before the 20th century, Crimean Tatars had immigrated from Crimea to Turkey in three waves: First, after the Russian annexation of Crimea in 1783; second, after the Crimean War of 1853–56; third, after the Russo-Turkish War of 1877–78.

References

Demographics of Turkey
Crimean Tatar diaspora
European diaspora in Turkey